Breakthrough in the Ardennes is a 1984 video game published by Strategic Simulations for the Apple II, Atari 8-bit family, and Commodore 64.

Gameplay
Breakthrough in the Ardennes is a game in which the Battle of the Bulge is simulated.

Reception
Mark Bausman reviewed the game for Computer Gaming World, and stated that "Overall, SSI has brought us another excellent simulation which can provide a real challenge for the computer wargamer."

Reviews
Computer Gaming World - Nov, 1991

References

External links
Review in Commodore Power/Play
Review in Tilt (French)

1984 video games
Apple II games
Atari 8-bit family games
Battle of the Bulge
Commodore 64 games
Computer wargames
Strategic Simulations games
Turn-based strategy video games
Video games about Nazi Germany
Video games developed in the United States
Video games set in Belgium
World War II video games